Katie Jarvis (born 22 June 1991) is an English actress, known for her roles as Mia Williams in Fish Tank (2009) and Hayley Slater in the BBC soap opera EastEnders (2018–2019).

Career
Jarvis was seen by a casting agent working for director Andrea Arnold, and was cast in her film Fish Tank, following a successful audition. She played Mia, a troublesome and aggressive 15-year-old girl from an underclass family, passionate about dance. The film was in the running for the Palme d'Or at the 62nd Cannes Film Festival, winning the Jury Prize. Jarvis won the British Independent Film Awards for her role.

In February 2018, she joined the BBC soap opera EastEnders as Hayley Slater. She left the series in February 2019.

In October 2019, Jarvis admitted that she had taken a "step back from acting" and began working as a security guard for B&M. Numerous tabloid newspapers wrote negatively about her working as a security guard, which was met with backlash from many celebrities who believed that the actress was "job shamed" by the press. They showed their support to Jarvis by sharing their "regular" jobs on social media.

Personal life
Jarvis was born in Dagenham, East London. She gave birth to a daughter, Lillie Mae, on 9 May 2009. On 19 April 2011, she gave birth to her son, Alfie.

In March 2019, it was reported that Jarvis was glassed while on a night out. On 31 July 2020, she was arrested in Southend-on-Sea on suspicion of assault and racially aggravated public order. She was later released on bail. Jarvis was ultimately charged with racially aggravated harassment, common assault and two counts of assault by beating. She appeared at magistrates' court on 14 April 2021, where she did not enter any pleas and chose to have a trial at Crown Court. Her representative told the court that she intended to plead not guilty to the charges, and that she was the victim of the attack and was acting in self defence. On 24 May 2021, Jarvis appeared at Crown Court and pled not guilty. She was bailed until her trial on 19 April 2022, where she admitted racially aggravated harassment and common assault and was sentenced to a two-year community order, with 200 hours of unpaid work and a requirement to complete 60 days of specified activities.

Filmography

Film

Television

Awards and nominations

References

External links

Living people
English film actresses
English soap opera actresses
People from Basildon
People from Tilbury
English actresses
1991 births